Igor Miladinović (born 25 June 1989) is a Serbian football midfielder who plays for IMT in Serbian League Belgrade.

References

External links
 
 Igor Miladinović stats at utakmica.rs 
 

1989 births
Living people
Footballers from Belgrade
Association football midfielders
Serbian footballers
FK Srem Jakovo players
FK Zemun players
FK Donji Srem players
Serbian SuperLiga players